Al-Rafidain TV is an Iraq-based Arabic television channel broadcasting from Istanbul, Turkey where its headquarters is located. Launched on 10 April 2006 on Nilesat, the channel is owned by Sunni Arabs and has an anti-Western agenda and supporting Association of Muslim Scholars.

References

External links 
 

2006 establishments in Egypt
Television stations in Iraq
Mass media in Baghdad
Mass media in Cairo
Television channels and stations established in 2006
Arabic-language television stations